The Rawang people are an ethnic group who inhabit far northern Kachin State of Burma (Myanmar). They speak the Rawang language. 

There are one D'rung family and several Anung families found among Lisu tribe people in Arunachal Pradesh in India. However, Nung rawang people and Anung (Lisu) people are two different groups.  Anung people speak and write in their own language. The Anung population mixed with Lisu tribe people in China is estimated about 20000.    According to cultural research and their own oral traditions, the Nung-Rawang are most likely Mongolian descendants who moved south from the Mongolian steppes to the 3 river region (Mekong, Yantzi, Salween)of China. During the second millennium, the Nung-Rawang migrated south west into the Himalayas at the top of Burma, seeking fertile farm lands. They settled in some of the most remote valleys and mountains in all of Burma. The Nung-Rawang are a proud, peaceful, industrious, agriculturally based mountain people known for their stability, hospitality, and colourful traditions. Living in the beautiful and isolated regions of northern Burma, they have also become prosperous through the plentiful supplies of jade and gold in their region. During the British colonial period, their very existence was thought to be a myth, as incoherent reports of "pygmy tribes" in the mountains of north Burma surfaced from time to time. The Drung, a sub tribe of the Nung-Rawang are short in stature, and are known for their crossbow hunting skills, and an extensive anthropological study has been initiated on this remote ethnic group by Dr. P. Christiaan Klieger of the California Academy of Sciences, since 2001.

External links
 Rawangs in China

Ethnic groups in Myanmar